Cirkuše v Tuhinju is a small settlement in the Tuhinj Valley in the Municipality of Kamnik in the Upper Carniola region of Slovenia.

Name
The name of the settlement was changed from Cirkuše to Cirkuše v Tuhinju in 1955.

References

External links 

Cirkuše v Tuhinju on Geopedia

Populated places in the Municipality of Kamnik